[1] The Honours System of Rhodesia was superseded by the Honours System of Zimbabwe in 1981.

References 

Post
Post-nominal letters
R